Coeur d'Alene Airport / Pappy Boyington Field  is a county-owned public-use airport, located in Kootenai County, Idaho, United States. It is located nine miles (14 km) northwest of the central business district of Coeur d'Alene and is surrounded by the city of Hayden on three sides.

The airport was known as Coeur d'Alene Air Terminal until September 2007, when it was renamed Coeur d'Alene Airport / Pappy Boyington Field to honor World War II multiple ace Col. Gregory "Pappy" Boyington (1912–1988), a Medal of Honor recipient born in Coeur d'Alene.

History
Built as Coeur d'Alene Municipal Airport in 1942 by the Corps of Engineers, it was equipped with two 5,400 ft x 500 ft. runways, the asphalt paving of which began in July 1942. A taxiway was also constructed, 5,400 ft. x 150 ft., but only paved to a width of 50 ft. The $357,729 paving contract was let to Roy S. Bair, of Spokane, Washington. A contract for electrical lighting for the field went to H. C. Moss, of Wenatchee, Washington, in the amount of $15,198.

Facilities and aircraft 

For the 12-month period ending May 31, 2007, the airport had 123,048 aircraft operations, an average of 337 per day: 77% general aviation, 22% air taxi and 1% military. There are 186 aircraft based at this airport: 81% single-engine, 8% multi-engine, 5% jet, 5% helicopter, 1% ultralight and <1% glider.

References

External links 
 Official site
 Coeur d'Alene Airport Association
 Coeur d'Alene Air Terminal at Idaho Transportation Department
  at Federal Aviation Administration

Airports in Idaho
Buildings and structures in Kootenai County, Idaho
Transportation in Kootenai County, Idaho